Roller hockey was one of three demonstration sports included in the official Olympic programme of the 1992 Summer Olympics, held in Barcelona. This sport's widespread popularity and the existence of top-level competitive teams in Catalonia (such as FC Barcelona and Reus Deportiu Hockey) prompted the Organizing Committee to suggest its inclusion in the Olympic programme.

The sport was held from July 26 to August 7, 1992, and it consisted of a single event for men and was contested in four venues in Catalonia: Vic, Sant Sadurní d'Anoia, Reus and Barcelona. A total of 12 nations entered a team, for a total of 120 players. The biggest contenders, Spain, Italy, Portugal and Argentina all finished in the first four places, with the Portuguese team (world champions from the 1991 Rink Hockey World Championship) failing to reach the podium, losing the third medal march to Italy, and Argentina winning the final match against the Spanish hosts. As a demonstration sports, the medals did not count to the final medal table.

In a preliminary round, the teams were divided into two groups according to the results of the 1991 Rink Hockey World Championship, held in Portugal. Group A games were played at the Pavelló del Club Patí Vic, in Vic, while Group B games were played at the Pavelló de l'Ateneu de Sant Sadurní, in Sant Sadurní d'Anoia. The best three teams of each group advanced to the semi-finals, which were played as a six-team group stage, at the Pavelló d'Esports, in Reus. In the end, the top two teams played each other in the final and the third and fourth placed teams played each other in a bronze medal match, at the Palau Blaugrana.

Final standings

Squads

Competition

Preliminary round

Group A

Group B

Semi-finals

 Key: Pts – points; Pld – matches played; W – win; D – draw; L – lost; GF – goals for; GA – goals against

Finals

Bronze medal match

Gold medal match

See also
 Roller Hockey World Cup
 Women's Roller Hockey World Cup
 Hockey
 Roller hockey (Quad)
 FIRS - International Roller Sports Federation

Notes

References
 
 

 
Roller hockey at the Summer Olympics
1992 Summer Olympics events
1992 in roller hockey
Discontinued sports at the Summer Olympics
Olympic demonstration sports